Tillandsia latifolia is a species of flowering plant in the genus Tillandsia. This species is native to Ecuador and Peru. Four varieties are recognized:

Tillandsia latifolia var. divaricata (Benth.) Mez - Peru, Ecuador
Tillandsia latifolia var. latifolia - Peru, Ecuador
Tillandsia latifolia var. leucophylla Rauh - Peru
Tillandsia latifolia var. major Mez - Peru

Cultivars
 Tillandsia 'Black Feather'
 Tillandsia 'Cajatambo'
 Tillandsia 'Canta'
 Tillandsia 'Delgado'
 Tillandsia 'Graffiti'
 Tillandsia 'Tom Thumb'

References

latifolia
Flora of Ecuador
Flora of Peru
Plants described in 1835